George Harrison "Heavy" Wheeler (November 10, 1881 – June 18, 1918) was a Major League Baseball pinch hitter who played in three games for the Cincinnati Reds in 1910.  He was an outfielder during his minor league career.

Wheeler made his major league debut on July 27, 1910 at the age of 28 and appeared in his final big league game on August 3 of that year. In three at-bats with the Reds, Wheeler collected zero hits, striking out twice.

Though Wheeler's major league career was short, his minor league career lasted eight seasons, from 1907 to 1914. In 119 games with the Terre Haute Hottentots in 1908 he hit .303, and in 124 games in 1913 - split between the Terre Haute Terre-iers and Indianapolis Indians - he hit .320. Overall, he hit .287 in 810 minor league games.

Following his death, he was interred at Little Flock Cemetery in Shelburn, Indiana.

References

External links

1881 births
1918 deaths
Cincinnati Reds players
Baseball players from Indiana
South Bend Greens players
Terre Haute Hottentots players
Troy Trojans (minor league) players
Jersey City Skeeters players
Terre Haute Stags players
Terre Haute Terre-iers players
Indianapolis Indians players
burials in Indiana